Thomas Turton (25 February 1780 – 7 January 1864) was an English academic and divine, the Bishop of Ely from 1845 to 1864.

Life
Thomas Turton was son of Thomas and Ann Turton of Hatfield, West Riding. He was admitted to Queens' College, Cambridge, in 1801 but migrated to St Catharine's College in 1804. In 1805 he graduated BA as senior wrangler and equal Smith's Prizeman. Elected a fellow of St Catharine's in 1806, he was Lucasian Professor of Mathematics from 1822 to 1826 and Regius Professor of Divinity from 1827 to 1842.

After various other clerical appointments, Turton was Dean of Peterborough from 1830 to 1842, Dean of Westminster from 1842 to 1845 and Bishop of Ely from 1845 to 1864.

He is buried at Kensal Green Cemetery.

Works
 1834: Thoughts on the Admission of Persons without Regard to their Religious Opinions to Certain Degrees in the Universities of England, Cambridge: The Pitt Press
 The Text of the English Bible
 The Roman Catholic doctrine of the Eucharist considered

References

Sources

External links

1780 births
1864 deaths
Alumni of Queens' College, Cambridge
Alumni of St Catharine's College, Cambridge
Bishops of Ely
19th-century Church of England bishops
Deans of Peterborough
Lucasian Professors of Mathematics
Regius Professors of Divinity (University of Cambridge)
Senior Wranglers
Deans of Westminster
Burials at Kensal Green Cemetery
Clergy from York